Totoralia is a genus of limpet-like helcionellid known from Cambrian deposits including the Burgess Shale.  It comprises two species.  T. reticulata bears a net-like pattern spread over a series of concentric ridges.

References

Burgess Shale fossils
Paleozoic life of Alberta